Volesky ( or ) is a surname of Belarusian and Ukrainian origin. People with this surname include:

Ron J. Volesky (born 1955), American lawyer and politician
Gary J. Volesky (born 1961), U.S. Army commander
Christian Volesky (born 1992), American professional soccer player

See also
 Volsky (disambiguation)
 Wolski

Belarusian-language surnames
Ukrainian-language surnames